Morgan Betorangal (born 25 August 1988) is a Chadian footballer who currently plays as left-back.

In December 2015, Betorangal signed an 18-month contract with MO Béjaïa.

See also
 List of Chad international footballers

References

External links

1988 births
Living people
Chadian footballers
Chadian expatriate footballers
Chad international footballers
French footballers
French sportspeople of Chadian descent
Black French sportspeople
Association football defenders
Luxembourg National Division players
Algerian Ligue Professionnelle 1 players
Botola players
RC Arbaâ players
FC Nantes players
UN Käerjéng 97 players
F91 Dudelange players
Chabab Rif Al Hoceima players
MO Béjaïa players
Racing Club de France Football players
FC UNA Strassen players
Place of birth missing (living people)
Chadian expatriate sportspeople in Algeria
Chadian expatriate sportspeople in Morocco
French expatriate sportspeople in Algeria
French expatriate sportspeople in Morocco
Expatriate footballers in Luxembourg
Expatriate footballers in Algeria